Phillip Toyne  (16 November 1947 – 13 June 2015) was an Australian environmental and indigenous rights activist, lawyer, and founder of Landcare Australia. He was the head of the Australian Conservation Foundation from 1986 to 1992. He negotiated the Pitjantjatjara Land Rights Act and the successful native title claim of the traditional owners of Uluru in 1983.

He was awarded the title of Officer of the Order of Australia in 2012, "For distinguished service to environmental law through executive and advisory roles, particularly the introduction of a National Landcare Program, to the protection and restoration of Australian landscapes, and to the Indigenous community."

He was the author of two books, 
 Growing up the country: the Pitjantjatjara struggle for their land (1984), 
 The reluctant nation: environment, law, and politics in Australia (1994), 

Toyne lived in Gundaroo and died in 2015 of bowel cancer, aged 67.

References 

1947 births
2015 deaths
Australian environmentalists
Deaths from cancer in New South Wales
Deaths from colorectal cancer
20th-century Australian lawyers
Officers of the Order of Australia
21st-century Australian lawyers